The R525 road is a  long regional road in Ireland which links the R466 near O'Brien's Bridge near the border with County Clare and Daly's Cross in County Limerick.

See also 

 Roads in Ireland
 National primary road
 National secondary road

References 

Regional roads in the Republic of Ireland
Roads in County Limerick